Thinadhoo may refer to several islands in the Maldives:

 Thinadhoo (Huvadhu Atoll), the capital of Gaafu Dhaalu region, Huvadhu Atoll
 Thinadhoo (Vaavu Atoll)
 Thinadhoo, a disappeared island of Haa Alif Atoll

See also
 Thiladhoo, an uninhabited island of Baa Atoll